"Backyard Boogie" is the lead single released from Mack 10's second album, Based on a True Story. The song was produced by Bobby "DJ Bobcat" Ervin and mixed by Ant Banks.

Released just prior to the release of Based on a True Story, "Backyard Boogie" became Mack 10's biggest hit on the Billboard Hot 100, reaching a peak of number 37. It became his second and final solo top-40 hit, after the previous year's "Nothin' But the Cavi Hit", a duet with Tha Dogg Pound. It also peaked at number 5 on the Hot Rap Songs chart, now known as the Rap Songs chart. It is one of the rapper's most successful songs to date. The song helped the album debut at number 14 on the Billboard 200 and get certified gold by the Recording Industry Association of America. On the single version of "Backyard Boogie", its follow-up single, "Only in California" featuring Ice Cube and Snoop Dogg, is also included. It never charted but was included on Based on a True Story.

Single track listing
"Backyard Boogie" – 4:11
"Backyard Boogie" (Instrumental) – 4:29
"Only In California" – 4:30 (featuring Ice Cube and Snoop Dogg) 
"Only In California" (Instrumental) – 4:30

Chart history

Peak positions

Year-End charts

References

1997 singles
Mack 10 songs
1997 songs
Gangsta rap songs
Priority Records singles
Songs written by Mack 10
Songs written by DJ Bobcat